The Roman and Eastern Catholic Churches in North America and Central America comprise 14 episcopal conferences, which together include 100 ecclesiastical provinces, each of which is headed by a Metropolitan archbishop. The provinces are in turn subdivided into 85 archdioceses, 400 non-archdiocesan dioceses and 15 territorial prelatures, each of which is headed by a Bishop or an Archbishop (metropolitan if he has one or more suffragans).  Some episcopal conferences include Military ordinariate (quasi dioceses), personal ordinariates and Eastern Catholic eparchies and/or exarchates that may not be part of an ecclesiastical province.

List of Roman Catholic Dioceses

Episcopal Conference of the Antilles

Ecclesiastical province of Castries 
 Metropolitan Archdiocese of Castries
 Diocese of Kingstown
 Diocese of Roseau
 Diocese of Saint George's in Grenada
 Diocese of Saint John's - Basseterre

Ecclesiastical province of Fort-de-France 
 Metropolitan Archdiocese of Fort-de-France
 Diocese of Basse-Terre

Ecclesiastical province of Kingston in Jamaica 
 Metropolitan Archdiocese of Kingston in Jamaica
 Diocese of Belize City-Belmopan
 Diocese of Mandeville
 Diocese of Montego Bay
 Mission Sui Iuris of Cayman Islands

Ecclesiastical province of Nassau 
 Metropolitan Archdiocese of Nassau
 Diocese of Hamilton in Bermuda
 Mission Sui Iuris of Turks and Caicos

Ecclesiastical province of Port of Spain 
 Metropolitan Archdiocese of Port of Spain
 Diocese of Bridgetown
 Diocese of Willemstad

Episcopal Conference of Canada

Ecclesiastical province of Edmonton 
 Metropolitan Archdiocese of Edmonton
 Diocese of Calgary
 Diocese of Saint Paul, Alberta

Ecclesiastical province of Gatineau 
 Metropolitan Archdiocese of Gatineau
 Diocese of Amos
 Diocese of Mont-Laurier
 Diocese of Rouyn-Noranda

Ecclesiastical province of Grouard-McLennan 
 Metropolitan Archdiocese of Grouard-McLennan
 Diocese of Mackenzie-Fort Smith

Ecclesiastical province of Halifax 
 Metropolitan Archdiocese of Halifax
 Diocese of Antigonish
 Diocese of Charlottetown
 Diocese of Yarmouth

Ecclesiastical province of Keewatin-Le Pas 
 Metropolitan Archdiocese of Keewatin-Le Pas
 Diocese of Churchill-Baie d'Hudson

Ecclesiastical province of Kingston 
 Metropolitan Archdiocese of Kingston
 Diocese of Alexandria-Cornwall
 Diocese of Peterborough
 Diocese of Sault Sainte Marie

Ecclesiastical province of Moncton 
 Metropolitan Archdiocese of Moncton
 Diocese of Bathurst
 Diocese of Edmundston
 Diocese of Saint John, New Brunswick

Ecclesiastical province of Montréal 
 Metropolitan Archdiocese of Montréal
 Diocese of Joliette
 Diocese of Saint-Jean-Longueuil
 Diocese of Saint-Jérôme
 Diocese of Valleyfield

Ecclesiastical province of Ottawa 
 Metropolitan Archdiocese of Ottawa
 Diocese of Hearst–Moosonee
 Diocese of Pembroke
 Diocese of Timmins

Ecclesiastical province of Québec 
 Metropolitan Archdiocese of Québec
 Diocese of Chicoutimi
 Diocese of Sainte-Anne-de-la-Pocatière
 Diocese of Trois Rivières

Ecclesiastical province of Regina 
 Metropolitan Archdiocese of Regina
 Diocese of Prince Albert
 Diocese of Saskatoon

Ecclesiastical province of Rimouski 
 Metropolitan Archdiocese of Rimouski
 Diocese of Baie-Comeau
 Diocese of Gaspé

Ecclesiastical province of Saint Boniface 
 Archdiocese of Saint Boniface (no suffragan)

Ecclesiastical province of St. John's, Newfoundland 
 Metropolitan Archdiocese of St. John's, Newfoundland
 Diocese of Grand Falls
 Diocese of Corner Brook and Labrador

Ecclesiastical province of Sherbrooke 
 Metropolitan Archdiocese of Sherbrooke
 Diocese of Nicolet
 Diocese of Saint-Hyacinthe

Ecclesiastical province of Toronto 
 Metropolitan Archdiocese of Toronto
 Diocese of Hamilton
 Diocese of London
 Diocese of Saint Catharines
 Diocese of Thunder Bay

Ecclesiastical province of Vancouver 
 Metropolitan Archdiocese of Vancouver
 Diocese of Kamloops
 Diocese of Nelson
 Diocese of Prince George
 Diocese of Victoria

Ecclesiastical province of Winnipeg 
 Archdiocese of Winnipeg (no suffragan)

Episcopal Conference of Costa Rica

Ecclesiastical province of San José de Costa Rica 
 Metropolitan Archdiocese of San José de Costa Rica
 Diocese of Alajuela
 Diocese of Cartago
 Diocese of Ciudad Quesada
 Diocese of Limón
 Diocese of Puntarenas
 Diocese of San Isidro de El General
 Diocese of Tilarán

Episcopal Conference of Cuba

Ecclesiastical province of San Cristobal de la Habana 
 Metropolitan Archdiocese of San Cristobal de la Habana
 Diocese of Matanzas
 Diocese of Pinar del Rio

Ecclesiastical province of Santiago de Cuba 
 Metropolitan Archdiocese of Santiago de Cuba
 Diocese of Guantánamo-Baracoa
 Diocese of Holguín
 Diocese of Santisimo Salvador de Bayamo y Manzanillo

Ecclesiastical province of Camagüey 
 Metropolitan Archdiocese of Camagüey
 Diocese of Ciego de Avila
 Diocese of Cienfuegos
 Diocese of Santa Clara

Episcopal Conference of the Dominican Republic

Ecclesiastical province of Santo Domingo 
 Metropolitan Archdiocese of Santo Domingo
 Diocese of Baní
 Diocese of Barahona
 Diocese of Nuestra Señora de la Altagracia en Higüey
 Diocese of San Juan de la Maguana
 Diocese of San Pedro de Macorís

Ecclesiastical province of Santiago de los Caballeros 
 Metropolitan Archdiocese of Santiago de los Caballeros
 Diocese of La Vega
 Diocese of Mao-Monte Cristi
 Diocese of Puerto Plata
 Diocese of San Francisco de Macorís

Episcopal Conference of El Salvador

Ecclesiastical province of San Salvador 
 Metropolitan Archdiocese of San Salvador
 Diocese of Chalatenango
 Diocese of San Miguel
 Diocese of San Vicente
 Diocese of Santa Ana
 Diocese of Santiago de María
 Diocese of Sonsonate
 Diocese of Zacatecoluca

Episcopal Conference of Guatemala

Ecclesiastical province of Guatemala 
 Metropolitan Archdiocese of Guatemala
 Diocese of Escuintla
 Diocese of Santa Rosa de Lima
 Diocese of Verapaz, Cobán
 Diocese of Zacapa y Santo Cristo de Esquipulas

Ecclesiastical province of Los Altos Quetzaltenango-Totonicapán 
 Metropolitan Archdiocese of Los Altos Quetzaltenango-Totonicapán
 Diocese of Huehuetenango
 Diocese of Quiché
 Diocese of San Marcos
 Diocese of Sololá-Chimaltenango
 Diocese of Suchitepéquez-Retalhuleu

Episcopal Conference of Haiti

Ecclesiastical province of Cap-Haïtien 
 Metropolitan Archdiocese of Cap-Haïtien
 Diocese of Fort-Liberté
 Diocese of Granada
 Diocese of Hinche
 Diocese of Les Gonaïves
 Diocese of Port-de-Paix

Ecclesiastical province of Port-au-Prince 
 Metropolitan Archdiocese of Port-au-Prince
 Diocese of Jacmel
 Diocese of Jérémie
 Diocese of Les Cayes

Episcopal Conference of Honduras

Ecclesiastical province of Tegucigalpa 
 Metropolitan Archdiocese of Tegucigalpa
 Diocese of Choluteca
 Diocese of Comayagua
 Diocese of Juticalpa
 Diocese of San Pedro Sula
 Diocese of Santa Rosa de Copán
 Diocese of Trujillo
 Diocese of Yoro

Episcopal Conference of Mexico

Ecclesiastical province of Acapulco 
 Metropolitan Archdiocese of Acapulco
 Diocese of Chilpancingo-Chilapa
 Diocese of Ciudad Altamirano
 Diocese of Tlapa

Ecclesiastical province of Antequera, Oaxaca 
 Metropolitan Archdiocese of Antequera, Oaxaca
 Diocese of Puerto Escondido
 Diocese of Tehuantepec
 Diocese of Tuxtepec
 Prelature of Huautla
 Prelature of Mixes

Ecclesiastical province of Chihuahua 
 Metropolitan Archdiocese of Chihuahua
 Diocese of Ciudad Juárez
 Diocese of Cuauhtémoc-Madera
 Diocese of Nuevo Casas Grandes
 Diocese of Parral
 Diocese of Tarahumara

Ecclesiastical province of Durango 
 Metropolitan Archdiocese of Durango
 Diocese of Mazatlán
 Diocese of Torreón
 Prelature of El Salto

Ecclesiastical province of Guadalajara 
 Metropolitan Archdiocese of Guadalajara
 Diocese of Aguascalientes
 Diocese of Autlán
 Diocese of Ciudad Guzmán
 Diocese of Colima
 Diocese of San Juan de los Lagos
 Diocese of Tepic
 Prelature of Jesús María del Nayar

Ecclesiastical province of Hermosillo 
 Metropolitan Archdiocese of Hermosillo
 Diocese of Ciudad Obregón
 Diocese of Culiacán
 Diocese of Nogales

Ecclesiastical province of Jalapa 
 Metropolitan Archdiocese of Jalapa
 Diocese of Coatzacoalcos
 Diocese of Córdoba
 Diocese of Orizaba
 Diocese of Papantla
 Diocese of San Andrés Tuxtla
 Diocese of Tuxpan
 Diocese of Veracruz

Ecclesiastical province of León 
 Metropolitan Archdiocese of León
 Diocese of Celaya
 Diocese of Irapuato
 Diocese of Querétaro

Ecclesiastical province of México 
 Metropolitan Archdiocese of Mexico
 Diocese of Atlancomulco
 Diocese of Cuernavaca
 Diocese of Toluca

Ecclesiastical province of Monterrey 
 Metropolitan Archdiocese of Monterrey
 Diocese of Ciudad Victoria
 Diocese of Linares
 Diocese of Matamoros
 Diocese of Nuevo Laredo
 Diocese of Piedras Negras
 Diocese of Saltillo
 Diocese of Tampico

Ecclesiastical province of Morelia 
 Metropolitan Archdiocese of Morelia
 Diocese of Apatzingan
 Diocese of Ciudad Lázaro Cárdenas
 Diocese of Tacámbaro
 Diocese of Zamora

Ecclesiastical province of Puebla de los Angeles 
 Metropolitan Archdiocese of Puebla de los Angeles
 Diocese of Huajuapan de León
 Diocese of Tehuacán
 Diocese of Tlaxcala

Ecclesiastical province of San Luis Potosí 
 Metropolitan Archdiocese of San Luis Potosí
 Diocese of Ciudad Valles
 Diocese of Matehuala
 Diocese of Zacatecas

Ecclesiastical province of Tijuana 
 Metropolitan Archdiocese of Tijuana
 Diocese of Ensenada
 Diocese of La Paz en la Baja California Sur
 Diocese of Mexicali

Ecclesiastical province of Tlalnepantla 
 Metropolitan Archdiocese of Tlalnepantla
 Diocese of Cuautitlán
 Diocese of Ecatepec
 Diocese of Netzahualcóyotl
 Diocese of Texcoco
 Diocese of Valle de Chalco

Ecclesiastical province of Tulancingo 
 Metropolitan Archdiocese of Tulancingo
 Diocese of Huejutla
 Diocese of Tula

Ecclesiastical province of Tuxtla Gutiérrez 
 Metropolitan Archdiocese of Tuxtla Gutiérrez
 Diocese of San Cristóbal de Las Casas
 Diocese of Tapachula

Ecclesiastical province of Yucatán  
 Metropolitan Archdiocese of Yucatán
 Diocese of Campeche
 Diocese of Tabasco
 Prelature of Cancún-Chetumal

Episcopal Conference of Nicaragua

Ecclesiastical province of Managua 
 Metropolitan Archdiocese of Managua
 Diocese of Esteli
 Diocese of Granada
 Diocese of Jinotega
 Diocese of Juigalpa
 Diocese of León en Nicaragua
 Diocese of Matagalpa

Episcopal Conference of Panama

Ecclesiastical province of Panamá 
 Metropolitan Archdiocese of Panamá
 Diocese of Chitré
 Diocese of Colón-Kuna Yala
 Diocese of David
 Diocese of Penonomé
 Diocese of Santiago de Veraguas
 Prelature of Bocas del Toro

Episcopal Conference of Puerto Rico (US Commonwealth)

Ecclesiastical province of San Juan de Puerto Rico
Metropolitan Archdiocese of San Juan de Puerto Rico
Diocese of Arecibo
Diocese of Caguas
Diocese of Mayagüez
Diocese of Ponce

Episcopal Conference of the United States of America

Ecclesiastical province of Anchorage 
Metropolitan Archdiocese of Anchorage
Diocese of Fairbanks
Diocese of Juneau

Ecclesiastical province of Atlanta 
Metropolitan Archdiocese of Atlanta
Diocese of Charleston
Diocese of Charlotte
Diocese of Raleigh
Diocese of Savannah

Ecclesiastical province of Baltimore 
Metropolitan Archdiocese of Baltimore
Diocese of Arlington
Diocese of Richmond
Diocese of Wheeling-Charleston
Diocese of Wilmington

Ecclesiastical province of Boston 
Metropolitan Archdiocese of Boston
Diocese of Burlington
Diocese of Fall River
Diocese of Manchester
Diocese of Portland
Diocese of Springfield in Massachusetts
Diocese of Worcester

Ecclesiastical province of Chicago 
Metropolitan Archdiocese of Chicago
Diocese of Belleville
Diocese of Joliet
Diocese of Peoria
Diocese of Rockford
Diocese of Springfield in Illinois

Ecclesiastical province of Cincinnati 
Metropolitan Archdiocese of Cincinnati
Diocese of Cleveland
Diocese of Columbus
Diocese of Steubenville
Diocese of Toledo
Diocese of Youngstown

Ecclesiastical province of Denver 
Metropolitan Archdiocese of Denver
Diocese of Cheyenne
Diocese of Colorado Springs
Diocese of Pueblo

Ecclesiastical province of Detroit 
Metropolitan Archdiocese of Detroit
Diocese of Gaylord
Diocese of Grand Rapids
Diocese of Kalamazoo
Diocese of Lansing
Diocese of Marquette
Diocese of Saginaw

Ecclesiastical province of Dubuque 
Metropolitan Archdiocese of Dubuque
Diocese of Davenport
Diocese of Des Moines
Diocese of Sioux City

Ecclesiastical province of Galveston-Houston 
Metropolitan Archdiocese of Galveston-Houston
Diocese of Austin
Diocese of Beaumont
Diocese of Brownsville
Diocese of Corpus Christi
Diocese of Tyler
Diocese of Victoria in Texas

Ecclesiastical province of Hartford 
Metropolitan Archdiocese of Hartford
Diocese of Bridgeport
Diocese of Norwich
Diocese of Providence

Ecclesiastical province of Indianapolis 
Metropolitan Archdiocese of Indianapolis
Diocese of Evansville
Diocese of Fort Wayne-South Bend
Diocese of Gary
Diocese of Lafayette in Indiana

Ecclesiastical province of Kansas City 
Metropolitan Archdiocese of Kansas City in Kansas
Diocese of Dodge City
Diocese of Salina
Diocese of Wichita

Ecclesiastical province of Los Angeles 
Metropolitan Archdiocese of Los Angeles
Diocese of Fresno
Diocese of Monterey
Diocese of Orange
Diocese of San Bernardino
Diocese of San Diego

Ecclesiastical province of Louisville 
Metropolitan Archdiocese of Louisville
Diocese of Covington
Diocese of Knoxville
Diocese of Lexington
Diocese of Memphis
Diocese of Nashville
Diocese of Owensboro

Ecclesiastical province of Miami 
Metropolitan Archdiocese of Miami
Diocese of Orlando
Diocese of Palm Beach
Diocese of Pensacola-Tallahassee
Diocese of St. Augustine
Diocese of St. Petersburg
Diocese of Venice

Ecclesiastical province of Milwaukee 
Metropolitan Archdiocese of Milwaukee
Diocese of Green Bay
Diocese of La Crosse
Diocese of Madison
Diocese of Superior

Ecclesiastical province of Mobile 
Metropolitan Archdiocese of Mobile
Diocese of Biloxi
Diocese of Birmingham in Alabama
Diocese of Jackson

Ecclesiastical province of New Orleans 
Metropolitan Archdiocese of New Orleans
Diocese of Alexandria in Louisiana
Diocese of Baton Rouge
Diocese of Houma-Thibodaux
Diocese of Lafayette in Louisiana
Diocese of Lake Charles
Diocese of Shreveport

Ecclesiastical province of New York 
Metropolitan Archdiocese of New York
Diocese of Albany
Diocese of Brooklyn
Diocese of Buffalo
Diocese of Ogdensburg
Diocese of Rochester
Diocese of Rockville Centre
Diocese of Syracuse

Ecclesiastical province of Newark 
Metropolitan Archdiocese of Newark
Diocese of Camden
Diocese of Metuchen
Diocese of Paterson
Diocese of Trenton

Ecclesiastical province of Oklahoma City 
Metropolitan Archdiocese of Oklahoma City
Diocese of Little Rock
Diocese of Tulsa

Ecclesiastical province of Omaha 
Metropolitan Archdiocese of Omaha
Diocese of Grand Island
Diocese of Lincoln

Ecclesiastical province of Philadelphia 
Metropolitan Archdiocese of Philadelphia
Diocese of Allentown
Diocese of Altoona-Johnstown
Diocese of Erie
Diocese of Greensburg
Diocese of Harrisburg
Diocese of Pittsburgh
Diocese of Scranton

Ecclesiastical province of Portland 
Metropolitan Archdiocese of Portland
Diocese of Baker
Diocese of Boise
Diocese of Great Falls-Billings
Diocese of Helena

Ecclesiastical province of Saint Louis 
Metropolitan Archdiocese of Saint Louis
Diocese of Jefferson City
Diocese of Kansas City-Saint Joseph
Diocese of Springfield-Cape Girardeau

Ecclesiastical province of Saint Paul and Minneapolis 
Metropolitan Archdiocese of Saint Paul and Minneapolis
Diocese of Bismarck
Diocese of Crookston
Diocese of Duluth
Diocese of Fargo
Diocese of New Ulm
Diocese of Rapid City
Diocese of Saint Cloud
Diocese of Sioux Falls
Diocese of Winona

Ecclesiastical province of San Antonio 
Metropolitan Archdiocese of San Antonio
Diocese of Amarillo
Diocese of Dallas
Diocese of El Paso
Diocese of Fort Worth
Diocese of Laredo
Diocese of Lubbock
Diocese of San Angelo

Ecclesiastical province of San Francisco 
Metropolitan Archdiocese of San Francisco
Diocese of Honolulu
Diocese of Las Vegas
Diocese of Oakland
Diocese of Reno
Diocese of Sacramento
Diocese of Salt Lake City
Diocese of San Jose in California
Diocese of Santa Rosa in California
Diocese of Stockton

Ecclesiastical province of Santa Fe 
Metropolitan Archdiocese of Santa Fe
Diocese of Gallup
Diocese of Las Cruces
Diocese of Phoenix
Diocese of Tucson

Ecclesiastical province of Seattle 
Metropolitan Archdiocese of Seattle
Diocese of Spokane
Diocese of Yakima

Ecclesiastical province of Washington 
Metropolitan Archdiocese of Washington
Diocese of Saint Thomas

Archdiocese for the Military Services, USA
 Archdiocese for the Military Services, USA (not Metropolitan)

Eastern Catholic dioceses in USA and Canada 
These partake in the US viz. Canadian ecclesiastical conference

Metropolia of Philadelphia for the Ukrainians
See: :Category:Ukrainian Catholic Metropolia of Philadelphia
The Ukrainian Catholic Metropolitan Province of Philadelphia consists of four eparchies of the Ukrainian Greek Catholic Church, and covers the entire United States.
Ukrainian Catholic Archeparchy of Philadelphia
Ukrainian Catholic Eparchy of Chicago
Ukrainian Catholic Eparchy of Saint Josaphat in Parma
Ukrainian Catholic Eparchy of Stamford

Metropolia of Pittsburgh for the Ruthenians
See: :Category:Byzantine Catholic Metropolia of Pittsburgh
The Byzantine Catholic Metropolitan Province of Pittsburgh is a sui iuris metropolia, traditionally linked to the Ruthenian Greek Catholic Church.  The metropolia consists of four eparchies of the Byzantine Rite Ruthenian Catholic Church and covers the entire United States, with jurisdiction for all Ruthenian Catholics in the United States, as well as other Byzantine Rite Catholics without an established hierarchy in the country.
 Byzantine Catholic Archeparchy of Pittsburgh
 Byzantine Catholic Eparchy of Holy Protection of Mary of Phoenix
 Byzantine Catholic Eparchy of Parma
 Byzantine Catholic Eparchy of Passaic

Other Eastern Catholic dioceses

The other Eastern Catholic Churches with eparchies (dioceses) or exarchates established in the United States are not grouped into metropoliae. All are immediately subject to the Holy See, with limited oversight by the head of their respective sui iuris church.

Other Byzantine Rite Eastern churches  
Melkite Greek Catholic Church
Eparchy of Newton

Romanian Byzantine Catholic Church
Eparchy of Saint George's in Canton (territory includes the U.S. and Canada)

Armenian Rite  
Armenian Catholic Church 
Eparchy of Our Lady of Nareg of New York

Antiochian Rite Eastern churches  
Maronite Catholic Church
Eparchy of Our Lady of Lebanon of Los Angeles
Eparchy of Saint Maron of Brooklyn

Syriac Catholic Church
Eparchy of Our Lady of Deliverance of Newark (territory includes the U.S. and Canada)

Syro-Malankara Catholic Church
Apostolic Exarchate of the United States of America

Syro-Oriental Rite churches 
Chaldean Catholic Church
Eparchy of Saint Peter the Apostle of San Diego
Eparchy of Saint Thomas the Apostle of Detroit

Syro-Malabar Catholic Church
Eparchy of Saint Thomas the Apostle of Chicago
Eparchy of Mississauga

Personal Ordinariate of the Chair of Saint Peter (Ordinariate Use) 

 Personal Ordinariate of the Chair of Saint Peter

See also 
 List of Catholic dioceses (alphabetical)

References 
http://www.catholic-hierarchy.org/diocese/qview1.html
http://www.catholic-hierarchy.org/diocese/qview2.html

North America